Universal Music Polska Sp. z o.o. (Universal Music Poland), is a Polish subsidiary of Universal Music Group, it was founded in 1998 in Warsaw. Labels CEO is Maciej Kutak after Jan Kubicki's departure.

Label was founded after PolyGram, within its Polish subsidiary was brought by Seagram and Universal Music Group was formed. UMP took over PolyGram Poland catalogue which included titles by such artists as Edyta Bartosiewicz, Renata Dąbkowska, Lidia Kopania, Kasia Kowalska and Sweet Noise among others. Although first albums under the label Universal Music Polska have been released in 1999.

UMP catalogue includes also Izabelin Studio (founded in 1989) releases which have been originally brought by PolyGram Poland in 1994 which included titles by such artists as Kolaboranci, Big Day and Closterkeller among others.

Universal Music Polska runs a subsidiary Magic Records Sp. z o.o. which was formed in 1998 with owners of record label Magic Records s.c. which releases dance and electronic music artists. Universal Music Polska runs also music publishing company under the name Universal Music Publishing Sp. z o.o.

UMP distributes in Poland releases of HQT Music Group, that include titles by such artists as Ewelina Lisowska, Taraka, Maciej Czaczyk and Patryk Kumór among others.

Artists

Current

Afro Kolektyw
Agata Szymczewska
Agnieszka Hekiert
Ania "AniKa" Dąbrowska
Ania Rusowicz 
Andrzej Grabowski 
Anna Maria Jopek
Big Cyc
Blue Café
Closterkeller
Cree
Damian Skoczyk
Damian Ukeje
Dr Misio
Edyta Strzycka
Ellie
Future Folk
Goya
Grzegorz Skawiński 
Halina Mlynkova 
KaCeZet & Fundamenty
Kamila
Kasia Kowalska 
Kasia Popowska
Kasia Wilk
Kim Nowak
Kombii
Lanberry
Maryla Rodowicz
Maleo Reggae Rockers
MashMish
Michał Kaczmarek
Muchy
Natalia Nykiel
Paulla
Pink Freud
Popkultura
Proletaryat
Rafał Brzozowski  
Roksana Węgiel
Sarsa
Stachursky
Stanisław Sojka
Sumptuastic
Szymon Wydra & Carpe Diem
Volver

Former
  
Agnieszka Chrzanowska
Akurat
Andrzej Cierniewski
Bartosz Wrona
Dezire (disbanded)
Dr Kamszot & Dj Mixdown
Doda
Dzika Kiszka
Edyta Bartosiewicz
Edyta Geppert 
Elektryczne Gitary 
Ewa Farna
Formacja Nieżywych Schabuff
Gabriel Fleszar 
Irena Jarocka (deceased)
Janusz Wawrowski
Jacek Krzaklewski
K2
Kangaroz
KarmaComa (disbanded)
Katarzyna Nosowska 
Konrad Skolarski
Krzysztof Herdzin
Kuba Sienkiewicz
Kumka Olik
Lady Pank 
Levity
Maciek Starnawski
Marek Napiórkowski
Michał Szpak
Mold
Natalia Kukulska 
Niebonie
Perfect
Patrycja Markowska
 Piotr Orzechowski (Pianohooligan)
Shakin Dudi
Stauros
Stare Miasto (disbanded)
Stereo Project
Świetliki & Bogusław Linda
Tamara Gee
Tercet Egzotyczny
Tosteer
The Jet Set (disbanded)
Vir
Virgin

See also
 BMG Poland
 EMI Music Poland
 Sony Music Entertainment Poland
 Sony BMG Music Entertainment Poland
 Warner Music Poland

References

External links
 Official website

Universal Music Group
Polish record labels